Łukasz Tomasz Żygadło (born 2 August 1979) is a Polish volleyball player. He was a member of the Polish national team in 1998–2014 (247 matches in the national team), participant at the 2012 Olympic Games, 2012 World League winner, silver medallist at the 2006 World Championship, Polish Champion (1999), two–time Italian Champion (2012, 2015), three–time Iranian Champion (2016, 2017, 2018), two–time Asian Club Championship winner, multiple Champions League and Club World Championship winner with the Italian team, Trentino Volley.

Personal life
Łukasz Żygadło was born in Sulechów, Poland. He attended School of Sports Championship in Rzeszów. He graduated from Częstochowa University of Technology with a master's degree in Management and Marketing. He is married to Agnieszka. He is an honorary resident of Trentino, Italy. He speaks Polish, Italian, English, Russian. He graduated in 2015 and receive diploma from Associazione Italiana Sommelier. He is a member of AIS in Italy.

Career

Clubs
He started his career in club Orion Sulechów. When he was 15, he moved to AZS Częstochowa. After graduation, he continued his career at the club from Częstochowa. Between 1997-2001, he won gold, silver and bronze medals in the Polish Championship and Polish Cup of 1998. Then he played for Polish clubs Nordea Czarni Radom and Skra Bełchatów. In the 2003/2004 season, he won the Polish Cup with his club, Polska Energia Sosnowiec. In 2004 he moved to Greece, to play for Panathinaikos Athens. With this club, he won the bronze medal of the Greek Championship. In the next season, 2005/2006, he played for Halkbank Ankara and won the bronze medal of the Turkish Championship. He was awarded the title of best setter of the Turkish League in 2006. In next the two seasons, he played for Polish club, ZAKSA Kędzierzyn-Koźle and Russian club Dinamo Kaliningrad.

In 2008, Żygadło moved to an Italian club, Itas Diatec Trentino, where he played for four seasons. During his time playing in Italy, he won the gold medal at the CEV Champions League three times with his club (2008/2009, 2009/2010, 2010/2011) and the bronze medal in 2012. He was chosen as the best setter of Champions League 2010. He won three gold medals in the FIVB Club World Championship (2009, 2010, 2011). With the club from Trentino, he won three silver (2008/2009, 2009/2010, 2011/2012) and one gold medal of the Italian Championship (2010/2011) and two Italian Cups (2010, 2012).

After four years, Żygadło moved to the Russian League, where he played for Fakel Novy Urengoy for one season, 2012/2013. Then he moved to another Russian club, Zenit Kazan. He signed a 2-year contract and replaced Italian setter Valerio Vermiglio. On October 6, 2013 he was injured during training. He lost season 2013/2014, because of injury. He broke his foot, which is after two surgeries and reconstructions of bone. In the club from Kazan he has been replaced by Serbian setter Nikola Grbić. After two surgeries, bone reconstruction and rehabilitation, Żygadło returned to training in March 2014. After the season 2013/2014 Żygadło left Zenit Kazan. The contract was terminated by mutual agreement of both parties. After two seasons spent in Russia Żygadło accepted an offer from Italian club Trentino Volley. He returned to the club, where he won several titles in 2008-2012. His official return to the club from Trentino was announced on July 10, 2014 and the player stated he was glad about his return to the city and the team. On May 13, 2015 he won title of Italian Champion with Trentino Volley.

In July 2015 he decided to leave the Italian team and signed a contract with newly founded Iranian club Sarmayeh Bank Tehran. On March 14, 2016 Iranian Volleyball Federation decided that Sarmayeh Bank Tehran achieved title of Iranian Champion because their opponent in finale Paykan Tehran was not able to attend in the third and the decisive game of the final series. Żygadło was one of the notable players in Iranian League that season and one of the best in his position.
In 2016-2017 season he went on to win second Iranian Championship with his team. On 6 July he won for second time Asian Club Championship which were held in Vietnam, received Best Setter Award of the tournament.

National team
He debuted in the Polish national team in 2000, when he was appointed to the matches of the World League, European and World Championships. On December 3, 2006, he won with the national team the silver medal of World Championship 2006 in Japan. On July 5, 2010, he gave up his career in the national team, because of the lack of training and lack of competition for his position in the composition.

On March 31, 2011, he returned to the national team after receiving an appointment from coach Andrea Anastasi. In 2011, he won three medals with the Polish national team: silver at World Cup and two bronzes at World League and European Championship. He is a gold medalist of World League 2012 in Sofia, Bulgaria. Despite his injury and lack of play in the 2013/2014 season, Polish coach Antiga appointed Żygadło to the national team in summer 2014.

Sporting achievements
 CEV Champions League
  2008/2009 – with Trentino Volley
  2009/2010 – with Trentino Volley
  2010/2011 – with Trentino Volley

 FIVB Club World Championship
  2009 Doha – with Trentino Volley
  2010 Doha – with Trentino Volley
  2011 Doha – with Trentino Volley

 AVC Asian Club Championship
  2016 Naypyidaw – with Sarmayeh Bank Tehran
  2017 Vietnam – with Sarmayeh Bank Tehran

 CEV Cup
  2014/2015 – with Trentino Volley

 National championships 
 1997/1998  Polish Cup, with AZS Częstochowa
 1998/1999  Polish Championship, with AZS Częstochowa
 2003/2004  Polish Cup, with Płomień Sosnowiec 
 2009/2010  Italian Cup, with Trentino Volley
 2010/2011  Italian Championship, with Trentino Volley
 2011/2012  Italian Cup, with Trentino Volley
 2014/2015  Italian Championship, with Trentino Volley
 2015/2016  Iranian Championship, with Sarmayeh Bank Tehran
 2016/2017  Iranian Championship, with Sarmayeh Bank Tehran
 2017/2018  Iranian Championship, with Sarmayeh Bank Tehran

Individual awards
 2004: Polish Cup – Best Setter
 2010: CEV Champions League – Best Setter
 2017: AVC Asian Club Championship – Best Setter

State awards
 2006:  Gold Cross of Merit

References

External links

 
 
 
 Player profile at LegaVolley.it 
 Player profile at PlusLiga.pl 
 Player profile at Volleybox.net

1979 births
Living people
People from Sulechów
Sportspeople from Lubusz Voivodeship
Polish men's volleyball players
Olympic volleyball players of Poland
Volleyball players at the 2012 Summer Olympics
Recipients of the Gold Cross of Merit (Poland)
Polish expatriate sportspeople in Greece
Expatriate volleyball players in Greece
Polish expatriate sportspeople in Turkey
Expatriate volleyball players in Turkey
Polish expatriate sportspeople in Russia
Expatriate volleyball players in Russia
Polish expatriate sportspeople in Italy
Expatriate volleyball players in Italy
Polish expatriate sportspeople in Iran
Expatriate volleyball players in Iran
Polish expatriate sportspeople in Qatar
Expatriate volleyball players in Qatar
AZS Częstochowa players
Czarni Radom players
Skra Bełchatów players
Panathinaikos V.C. players
Halkbank volleyball players
ZAKSA Kędzierzyn-Koźle players
Trentino Volley players
Setters (volleyball)